Jean-Hilaire Belloc (27 November 1786 in Nantes – 9 December 1866 in Paris) was a French painter.

Life
Belloc was a student in the studio of Antoine Gros then of Jean-Baptiste Regnault.  He won a medal at the 1810 Paris Salon for his Death of Gaul, friend of Ossian.

He was professor of drawing at the l'École-de-Médecine.  He was made a Chevalier of the légion d'honneur in 1864.
A bust of him was placed in the cimetière du Père Lachaise in November 2006.

Family
On 2 June 1821 he married Louise Swanton, an accomplished writer and translator of English literature into French. Their son, Louis, would later marry Bessie Rayner Parkes, a prominent English feminist who remained a close personal friend of Swanton's long after the premature death of her husband. Louis Belloc and Parkes had two children who became writers: Marie Adelaide Belloc Lowndes and Hilaire Belloc.

Works

Death of Gaul, friend of Ossian, 1810
The Flight into Egypt, 1812
The Resting of the Holy Family, 1831
Madame Belloc, His Daughter and the Painter, 1831 (Louvre)
Portrait of Arthur Dillon, 1834 (museum of Versailles), right
Death of Saint Louis, 1838
Portrait of a lady in a chapeau-cloche, (Musée Magnin Dijon)

Notes & Sources

1786 births
1866 deaths
18th-century French painters
French male painters
19th-century French painters
Chevaliers of the Légion d'honneur
Pupils of Antoine-Jean Gros
Artists from Nantes
Burials at Père Lachaise Cemetery
Jean-Hilaire
19th-century French male artists
18th-century French male artists